Nigel John Dakin  (born 28 February 1964) is a British diplomat currently serving as Governor of the Turks and Caicos Islands. He assumed office on 15 July 2019 in a swearing-in ceremony before the territory's House of Assembly.

On 15 December 2022, the Foreign, Commonwealth, & Development Office issued a press release announcing that Nigel Dakin would be leaving his post in June 2023. He will be succeeded at that time by Dileeni Daniel-Selvaratnam, the current Governor of Anguilla.

Early life and education 
Dakin was born on 28 February 1964 in Birmingham, England, and is the son of John Frederick Dakin and Dorothy Alice Dakin (née Scott). He grew up in Bournville and was educated at the King Edward VI Five Ways School, a state grammar school in Birmingham, England. Having secured, while at school, an Army Scholarship, Dakin entered the Royal Military Academy Sandhurst in 1982 and was commissioned into the British Army in 1983. Following service as an Infantry Platoon Commander in Northern Ireland he studied, again on a military scholarship, at the University of Birmingham between 1984 and 1987, where he received a Bachelor of Arts in Political Science. He would later receive a Masters in Business Administration from Kingston University in 1995.

Career 

Following university, Dakin returned to the Army, serving in West Germany and Northern Ireland. In 1993 he was mentioned in dispatches for gallantry in Northern Ireland and between 1994 and 1996 served as a Staff Officer in the Ministry of Defence advising the Defence Secretary (Michael Portillo) and Chief of the Defence Staff (Field Marshall Peter Inge) on matters relating to the Irish Peace Process.

In 1996, Dakin accepted a position within the Foreign and Commonwealth Office (FCO). He first lead staff groups involved in Russia and later on Counter Terrorism and, promoted to Director; he served on the executive board where he oversaw organisational transformation. Concurrently, he was invited by the then Chief of the General Staff, General Sir Nick Carter, to serve as the civilian Non-Executive Director on both the Army No. 1 Board and the Army Higher Honours Committee, a position he retained until 2019.

While overseas Dakin served as First Secretary (Political) in Nigeria (1998–99) and India (1999-2001) and then as the Political Counsellor in Pakistan (2007-2010) and Afghanistan (2012-2013). He served twice in the British Embassy in Washington DC: first from 2005 to 2007 working with the US Administration of George W. Bush on Iraq, Afghanistan and Counter Terrorism and again between 2016 and 2019 as the Senior National Security Official to the UK Ambassador to the United States.

Governor of the Turks and Caicos 

In May 2019, the Foreign and Commonwealth Office announced that Dakin would succeed outgoing Governor John Freeman as Governor of the Turks and Caicos. As such, Dakin is the representative of His Majesty The King and acts as the de facto Head of State responsible for appointing the Head of Government, and senior political positions in the territory. Dakin is also responsible for carrying out key duties to support the people of the islands, such as chairing Cabinet and ensuring the good governance of the territory. The Constitution also reserves to the Governor responsibility for defence, external affairs, the regulation of international financial services and internal security, including the police force.

Honours 
Dakin was appointed Companion of the Order of St Michael and St George (CMG) in the 2020 Birthday Honours for services to British foreign policy.

Personal life 
He married Amanda Dakin (née Johnson) in 1987, in her home country of Barbados. They have two children; Charlotte (known as Charlie) and Fraser.

References 

Governors of the Turks and Caicos Islands
1964 births
20th-century British diplomats
Alumni of the University of Birmingham
Alumni of Kingston University
Companions of the Order of St Michael and St George
People educated at King Edward VI Five Ways
Living people
Graduates of the Royal Military Academy Sandhurst